Intens Reborn is a television news entertainment program formatting infotainment that is broadcast on the Indonesian TV station iNews. This program sequel from original version Intens aired at RCTI on 2010. This program  hosted by Cut Tary, and primarily reports on celebrity news and gossip, along with previews of upcoming films and television shows, regular segments about all of those three subjects, along with overall film and television industry news.

References 

Indonesian television news shows
Indonesian-language television shows
2019 Indonesian television series debuts
2010s Indonesian television series
INews original programming
Entertainment news shows in Indonesia
Mass media in Indonesia stubs
Asian television show stubs